Hakubutsukan-Dobutsuen Station is a former station of the Keisei Electric Railway in Taito-ku, Tokyo. It is located between Nippori Station and Keisei Ueno Station. It opened in 1933, but was closed on 1 April 1997 due to the length of the platform being too short for most trains. The station was formally abandoned in April 2004. The station building and platform are still in existence and have been renovated and opened to the public in 2018.

References

External links 
 旧博物館動物園駅 - 京成電鉄

Railway stations in Tokyo
Stations of Keisei Electric Railway
Defunct railway stations in Japan
Railway stations in Japan opened in 1933
Railway stations closed in 1997